Procambarus connus, the Carrollton crayfish, is a species of crayfish in the family Cambaridae. It is endemic to the area around Carrollton, in Carroll County, Mississippi. It is listed as Data Deficient on the IUCN Red List.

References

Cambaridae
Natural history of Mississippi
Freshwater crustaceans of North America
Taxonomy articles created by Polbot
Crustaceans described in 1978
Taxa named by Joseph F. Fitzpatrick Jr.